Herefordshire Council is the local government authority for the county of Herefordshire in England. It is a unitary authority, combining the powers of a non-metropolitan county and district.

History
The council was formed on 1 April 1998 following the split of Hereford and Worcester back into two separate counties. The newly formed council was granted the right to use the coat of arms of the earlier Herefordshire County Council which had been abolished in 1974. The council initially had its headquarters at Brockington House, 35 Hafod Road, Hereford but moved to Plough Lane in Hereford in 2009.
Formal meetings of the council are held at the Shirehall in Hereford.

Elections

The council uses the Leader and Cabinet constitutional model. It was run by the Conservatives until 2019.

Immediately following 2019 local elections
The 2019 election resulted in the Conservative Party losing its majority on the council for the first time since 2007, winning 13 seats. Independents made gains and became the largest group on the council after winning 18 seats, 15 of which formed the Herefordshire Independents Group. The Liberal Democrats and Greens also made gains at the expense of the Conservatives. It's Our County lost four seats, down to 8.

Following negotiations, a three-way coalition between 'Herefordshire Independents', 'It's Our County' and the Green Party was formed. Herefordshire Independents took four cabinet positions, and the Leader of the Council, the Greens took two cabinet positions and Deputy Leader of the Council and It's Our County took the remaining two cabinet positions.

The Ross North poll was postponed after the death of a UKIP candidate, leading to one unfilled vacancy at this point.

Defections and resignations

Following disagreements about a new by-pass road in the Herefordshire Independents group, five councillors left to form a new group, 'True Independents'.

Separately, Sue Boulter resigned shortly after being elected for It's Our County, in Whitecross, creating a second vacancy and temporarily reducing the number of It's Our County councillors.

Two by-elections

The Liberal Democrats won the by-election in Ross North the day after the five True Independents defected from the Herefordshire Independents.

Following Sue Boulter's resignation upon her election, her husband won the resulting by-election.

Unaligned Independents join the Herefordshire Independents

By the end of the summer, former Hereford city mayor Jim Kenyon had temporarily joined the Herefordshire Independents to bolster their numbers, and since left again to sit as the last remaining standalone independent, as the other two previously unaligned independents have since joined the ruling coalition of Herefordshire Independents, taking Herefordshire Independents to 12 seats.

Outsourced services
Herefordshire Council has outsourced the following services:
Human Resources & Finance – outsourced to a limited company named "Hoople", which is wholly owned by the Council and Wye Valley NHS Trust
Leisure – Halo Leisure (A not-for-profit trust which operates all leisure services)
Social Housing – Herefordshire Housing (A not-for-profit trust which operates all housing and accommodation services)
Commercial Services – Amey Wye Valley Services (A commercial venture which maintains roads, grounds, street lighting, etc.)
Waste Management – Severn Waste Management (Responsible for bin collection, sorting and recycling)

References

External links
Herefordshire Council

Unitary authority councils of England
Leader and cabinet executives
Local education authorities in England
Local authorities in Herefordshire
Billing authorities in England